Richard Jungclaus (17 March 1905 - 15 April 1945) was a German SS-Gruppenführer and Generalleutnant  of Police who served as the Higher SS and Police Leader (HSSPF) in Belgium and Northern France. A member of the Waffen-SS, he was killed in combat in the Independent State of Croatia toward the end of the Second World War.

Early life and career
Jungclaus was born in Freiburg, the son of a merchant. After his schooling, he completed an apprenticeship as a textile salesman and took over his father's business. He joined the Nazi Party (member number 305,661) and the Sturmabteilung (SA) in 1930  and switched from the SA to the Schutzstaffel (SS) on 29 April 1931 (SS number 7,368). 

He held lower level command positions until June 1935 when he took a staff posting as adjutant to August Heissmeyer, the head of the SS Main Office in Berlin. From October 1937 to November 1938, he was commander of the 12th SS-Standarte headquartered in Hanover. He was then advanced to command of SS-Abschnitt (District) IV, also based in Hanover, and served in that capacity until 1 April 1942.

War years
Jungclaus joined the Waffen-SS in January 1940 and, after completing training, was commissioned an SS-Untersturmführer in May. He served with the 11th and 4th Totenkopfstandarten until April 1941 and then with the Regiment Westland of the 5th SS Panzer Division Wiking until September. From September 1941 to April 1942, he worked as an advisor to the Dutch SS. Then, until August 1944, he helped establish and direct the Flemish SS in Brussels, under the eponymous Dienststelle Jungclaus (Department Jungclaus).

From 1 August 1944 to 16 September 1944, Jungclaus was the Higher SS and Police Leader (HSSPF) "Belgien-Nordfrankreich." He was the first holder of this position. In addition, from 14 August 1944 he was the  Wehrmachtbefehlshaber (Military Commander) of all Wehrmacht forces in Belgium and Northern France. During the war, he earned the Iron Cross, 2nd class and the War Merit Cross, 1st and 2nd class with swords. As Allied forces approached Brussels, Jungclaus retreated and released 600 prisoners. He was subsequently relieved of his position and demoted personally by Heinrich Himmler on 16 September. Transferred to the 7th SS Volunteer Mountain Division, "Prinz Eugen," he died in combat operations in Zavidovići, Independent State of Croatia (today, in Bosnia and Herzegovina) on 15 April 1945.

SS and police ranks

References

Sources

Other reading

1905 births
1945 deaths
People from Freiburg im Breisgau
Recipients of the Iron Cross (1939), 2nd class
Recipients of the War Merit Cross
SS and Police Leaders
SS-Gruppenführer
Sturmabteilung officers
Waffen-SS personnel killed in action